The Veterinarian's Adopted Children is a 1968 Danish comedy film directed by Carl Ottosen and starring Dirch Passer.

Cast

 Dirch Passer - Dyrlæge Linsager
 Ove Sprogøe - Dr. Louis Hansen
 Judy Gringer - Birgitte
 Carl Ottosen - Dr. Linsager
 Karl Stegger - Carl Nielsen
 Susanne Bruun-Koppel - Dorte Nielsen
 Folmer Rubæk - Niels
 Else Petersen - Fru Eriksen
 Axel Strøbye - Benny
 Lone Hertz - Kirsten
 Winnie Mortensen - Winnie
 Lise Henningsen - Fru Andersen
 Poul Glargaard - Erik Olsson
 Miskow Makwarth - Ole
 Lise Thomsen - Ane
 Mogens Brandt - Sagfører
 Helen Michelsen - Winnies mor
 Ellen Staal - Martha
 Holger Munk - Nyrespecialisten

External links

1968 films
1960s Danish-language films
1968 comedy films
Films directed by Carl Ottosen
Films scored by Sven Gyldmark
Danish comedy films